Dalbergia andapensis is a species of flowering plant in the legume family, Fabaceae. It is endemic to Madagascar.

This species is a tree growing up to 8 meters tall. It grows in humid rainforest habitat. It is limited to the northern part of Madagascar, where it is threatened by habitat destruction.

References

andapensis
Endemic flora of Madagascar
Endangered plants
Taxonomy articles created by Polbot